The following list of highest scores in figure skating contains the highest scores earned from the 2018–19 season onwards, under the ISU Judging System (IJS). The 2018–19 season began on 1 July 2018.

After being trialed in 2003, the IJS replaced the old 6.0 system in the 2004–2005 figure skating season. Up to and including the 2017–2018 season, the Grade of Execution (GOE) scoring system for each program element ranged between –3 and +3. Starting with the 2018–19 season, the GOE was expanded to range between –5 and +5. Hence, the International Skating Union (ISU) have restarted all records from the 2018–19 season and all previous statistics have been marked as "historical". Accordingly, this page lists only the highest scores achieved from the 2018–19 season onwards, using the –5/+5 GOE scoring range.

The following lists are included:
Records: current record holders; technical and component record scores; progression of record scores
Personal bests: highest personal best scores; highest PB technical element scores; highest PB program component scores
Absolute bests: lists of absolute best scores

Note: In the case of personal best lists, only one score is listed for any one skater, i.e. their personal best. The absolute best lists may include more than one score for the same skater.

The ISU only recognizes the best scores that are set at international competitions run under the ISU's rules, and does not recognize, for example, scores that are obtained at national figure skating championships. The competitions recognized by the ISU are: Winter Olympics (including the team event), Youth Olympics (including the team event), World Championships, World Junior Championships, European Championships, Four Continents Championships, GP events, Junior GP events, Challenger Series events, and World Team Trophy.

Record holders

Men

Women

Pairs

Ice dance

Technical and component record scores 
TES = Technical Element ScorePCS = Program Component Score

Men

Women

Pairs

Ice dance

Highest personal best scores 
The following lists include only personal best scores of skaters. To see lists where multiple scores from the same skater are included, see absolute best scores.

Note: ISU does not recognize scores which are achieved at national championships.

Men

Best total scores

Best short program scores

Best free skating scores

Women

Best total scores

Best short program scores

Best free skating scores

Pairs

Best total scores

Best short program scores

Best free skating scores

Ice dance

Best total scores

Best rhythm dance scores

Best free dance scores

Absolute best scores

Men

Best total scores

Best short program scores

Best free skating scores

Women

Best total scores

Best short program scores

Best free skating scores

Pairs

Best total scores

Best short program scores

Best free skating scores

Ice dance

Best total scores

Best rhythm dance scores

Best free dance scores

Progression of record scores

Men

Total score 
Progression of men's combined total record score.

Short program score 
Progression of men's short program record score.

Free skating score 
Progression of men's free skating record score.

Women

Total score 
Progression of women's combined total record score.

Short program score 
Progression of women's short program record score.

Free skating score 
Progression of women's free skating record score.

Pairs

Total score 
Progression of pairs' combined total record score.

Short program score 
Progression of pairs' short program record score.

Free skating score 
Progression of pairs' free skating record score.

Ice dance

Total score 
Progression of ice dance combined total record score.

Rhythm dance score 
Progression of rhythm dance record score.

Free dance score 
Progression of free dance record score.

Highest personal best technical element scores 
TES = Technical Element Score

Men

Short program

Free skating

Women

Short program

Free skating

Pairs

Short program

Free skating

Ice dance

Rhythm dance

Free dance

Progression of record technical element scores 
TES = Technical Element Score

Men

Short program 
Progression of men's short program record TES score.  This list starts from the skater who first scored above 50 points.

Free skating 
Progression of men's free skating record TES score. This list starts from the skater who first scored above 90 points.

Women

Short program score 
Progression of women's short program record TES score. This list starts from the skater who first scored above 40 points.

Free skating score 
Progression of women's free skating record TES score. This list starts from the skater who first scored above 70 points.

Pairs

Short program score 
Progression of pairs' short program record TES score. This list starts from the pair who first scored above 40 points.

Free skating score 
Progression of pairs' free skating record  TES score. This list starts from the pair who first scored above 70 points.

Ice dance

Rhythm dance score 
Progression of rhythm dance record TES score. This list starts from the team who first scored above 40 points.

Free dance score 
Progression of free dance record TES score. This list starts from the team who first scored above 65 points.

Highest personal best program component scores 
PCS = Program Component Score

Men

Short program

Free skating

Women

Short program

Free skating

Pairs

Short program

Free skating

Ice dance

Rhythm dance

Free dance

Miscellaneous records and highest element scores

Miscellaneous records 
Note: Only jumps landed in ISU sanctioned international competitions are listed. Jumps landed in domestic and non-ISU sanctioned international competitions will not be considered.

For verification purposes, only significant achievements reported by the news media will be included.

Men 

First to land a type of quad

First to land a type of quad in combination or in sequence

First to land multiple quads in a competition

First to land multiple quads in a single program

First to land different types of quads

Women 
First to land a type of jump

First to land a type of triple Axel or quad in combination or in sequence

First to land multiple triple Axels in a competition

First to land multiple quads in a competition

First to land both a triple Axel and quad jump in a single program

First to complete the free skating without doubles

First to land different types of quads

First to land the maximum number of triples allowed

Women who landed the triple Axel cleanly

Several other skaters have landed the triple Axel, but only at domestic events:
  Kimmie Meissner landed a triple Axel at the 2005 U.S. Championships.
  Ayaka Hosoda landed three clean triple Axels at the 2018–19 Japan Championships.
  Sofia Muravieva landed two clean triple Axels at the 2022 Russian Championships, and one at the 2022 Russian Junior Championships.
  Adeliia Petrosian landed a triple Axel at the 2023 Russian Championships.
  Sofia Titova landed two triple Axels at the 2023 Russian Junior Championships.
 Other skaters who have landed the triple axel at smaller domestic events include Maria Dmitrieva of Russia and Amber Glenn and Phoebe Stubblefield of the United States.

Women who landed a quadruple jump cleanly

Several other skaters have landed quadruple jumps, but only at domestic events:

  Rika Kihira landed a quadruple Salchow at the 2020–21 Japan Championships.
  Mao Shimada landed a quadruple toe loop at the 2021–22 Japan Junior Championships.
  Adeliia Petrosian landed two quadruple loops at the 2022 Russian Championships, and one quadruple flip at the 2023 Russian Grand Prix Final.
  Alisa Dvoeglazova landed two quadruple toe loops at the 2022 Russian Junior Championships.
  Alina Gorbacheva, Sofia Titova, and Maria Gordeeva each landed a quadruple Salchow at the 2023 Russian Junior Championships.
 Other skaters who have landed a quadruple jump in smaller domestic competitions include Elizaveta Berestovskaia and Daria Sadkova of Russia.

Pairs

Highest element scores 
GOE = Grade of Execution
BV = Base value

These are the highest scored elements using the new –5/+5 GOE range. Note: an 'x' after the base value means that the base value has been multiplied by 1.1 because the jump was executed in the second half of the program.

Men

Highest valued single jumps

Highest valued combos

Women

Highest valued triple Axels

Highest valued quadruples

Highest valued combos starting with a quad

Highest valued combos starting with a triple Axel

Highest valued combos without a quad or a triple Axel

Pairs

Highest valued twists

Highest valued throw jumps

Highest valued lifts

Highest valued jump sequences/combos

Ice dance

Highest valued combination lifts 

CuLi: Curve Lift; RoLi: Rotational Lift; SlLi: Straight Line Lift; StaLi: Stationary Lift

See also 
 List of highest junior scores in figure skating
 List of highest historical scores in figure skating
 List of highest historical junior scores in figure skating
 ISU Judging System
 Figure skating records and statistics

References

External links 
 International Skating Union

Figure skating-related lists
Figure skating records and statistics